USS Wave has been the name of more than one United States Navy ship, and may refer to:

 , a schooner commissioned in 1836 and in service until 1846.
 , a gunboat commissioned in 1863 and captured by Confederate forces in 1864 during the American Civil War.
 , a fishing trawler identified for World War I U.S. Navy service as a minesweeper and ordered delivered in 1917 and 1918 but never actually taken over by the Navy.
 , a ferryboat commissioned in 1916 and struck in 1938.

United States Navy ship names